Abigail Louise Dentus (born 3 May 1997) is a British track and road cyclist. In 2018, Dentus was part of the Team Breeze squad that won the team pursuit at the British National Track Championships with Jenny Holl, Rebecca Raybould and Jessica Roberts.

Major results

2013
 National Youth Track Championships
1st  Points race
3rd Individual pursuit
3rd Madison (with Lucy Shaw)
3rd Scratch
2014
 10th RideLondon Grand Prix
2015
 National Junior Track Championships
2nd Individual pursuit
3rd Points race
 10th Women's Tour de Yorkshire
2017
 2nd Madison, National Track Championships (with Rebecca Raybould)
2018
 1st  Team pursuit, National Track Championships
 2nd  Team pursuit, UEC European Under-23 Track Championships

References

External links

1997 births
Living people
British female cyclists
British track cyclists
21st-century British women